"9 to 5" (or "Morning Train") is a popular song written by British songwriter Florrie Palmer and recorded by Scottish singer Sheena Easton in 1980, becoming her biggest hit. It peaked at number three in the United Kingdom in August 1980 and was certified gold. In February 1981, it was released in the United States and Canada under the title "Morning Train (Nine to Five)" to avoid confusion with Dolly Parton's recent hit "9 to 5". It reached number one in both countries, becoming Easton's only chart-topper in those nations.

Easton had released one single prior to "9 to 5": "Modern Girl". This had failed to chart highly, but after exposure on the BBC documentary, The Big Time: Pop Singer, both "9 to 5" and "Modern Girl" were propelled into the top ten at the same time, making her the third female artist (after Ruby Murray and Shirley Bassey) to achieve this feat. "9 to 5" became a top three hit and was one of the best-selling singles of the year.

Early in 1981, EMI Records decided to launch Easton in the US and released "9 to 5" as her debut single. The title of the song was changed to "Morning Train (Nine to Five)" to avoid confusion with the Dolly Parton song of the same name, which charted nearly simultaneously with Easton's record. Easton's song went to #1 on both the U.S. pop and adult contemporary charts; it remained at the top for two weeks on Billboard'''s pop chart.  On Billboard 1981 year-end charts, it came in as the twelfth-biggest pop and thirteenth-biggest AC hit of the year 1981.  It also topped the RPM magazine pop and AC charts in Canada, reigning over the former for two weeks in May 1981, while also reaching the summit in New Zealand, before being replaced by Joy Division's "Love Will Tear Us Apart".

The song is about a woman who waits at home all day for her man to come home from work. The music video was filmed on the Bluebell Railway, a heritage line running between East and West Sussex in England. The video stars London and South Western Railway No. 488, a preserved LSWR 0415 Class locomotive.

Chart performance

Weekly charts

Year-end charts

Other versions
Easton re-recorded the song ("El Primer Tren") for her Spanish-language album Todo Me Recuerda a Tí, in 1983 for the Latin markets.

Swedish-born Norwegian singer Elisabeth Andreassen covered the song in Swedish, as "Han pendlar varje dag" ("He commutes every day") with the new lyrics by Olle Bergman, on her 1981 album Angel of the Morning. This version also stayed at Svensktoppen for 9 weeks during the period 21 February-18 April 1982, with a chart peak of #4.

Also in 1981, the Bulgarian-French singer Sylvie Vartan recorded a French cover of the song entitled "L'amour, c'est comme une cigarette" ("Love is like a cigarette"), with lyrics entirely unrelated to the Easton original.

In 1981, the Czech singer Helena Vondráčková recorded a cover called "Nač vlastně v půli vzdávat mač" ("Why actually give up a match in the middle?"). The Czech text was written by Zdeněk Borovec.

Idols South Africa winner Anke Pietrangeli covered the song on her album Tribute to the Great Female Vocalists in 2009.

St. Vincent recorded a cover with different lyrics on her 2021 album,  Daddy's Home, titled My Baby Wants a Baby. The album release credits Annie Clark and Florrie Palmer for writing.

In popular culture
It was revealed in the documentary John Peel's Record Box that British radio DJ John Peel loved the record so much that he kept two copies of it in a small wooden box of his 142 favourite singles.

It was referenced in a Not the Nine O'Clock News sketch, with Pamela Stephenson playing a housewife who sings the song while cleaning the house. Her husband, played by Rowan Atkinson returns home, and corrects the wording, beginning by pointing out that he travels to work by bus, not by train, to which Stephenson sings the lines again incorporating the corrected statements.

The song was featured twice in the NBC sitcom Seinfeld. It first appeared in a scene from the season 8 episode "The Bizarro Jerry"', in a montage of Kramer's "work" experience. Its second appearance was in the season 9 episode "The Butter Shave", where George Costanza pretends to be handicapped at work.

In 2001, it was featured in the South Park season 5 episode 13, "Kenny Dies".

The song features in the 2004 movie EuroTrip: the character of Scotty is forced to sing it in a Manchester United backer's bar.

The beginning of the song is sung by one of the characters in the NBC series Will & Grace in season 8, episode 16, “Grace Expectations”.

The song’s melody is interpolated heavily in ‘My Baby Wants A Baby’, on St. Vincent's sixth studio album,  Daddy’s Home, and Florrie Palmer is credited as a co-writer. 

The song is featured in the NBC series Good Girls'' in season 3, episode 4, "The Eye in Survivor".

See also
Cashbox Top 100 number-one singles of 1981
List of Billboard Hot 100 number-one singles of 1981
List of train songs

References

External links

1980 singles
1981 singles
Sheena Easton songs
Elisabeth Andreassen songs
Billboard Hot 100 number-one singles
Cashbox number-one singles
Number-one singles in Australia
Number-one singles in New Zealand
RPM Top Singles number-one singles
Song recordings produced by Christopher Neil
Songs about trains
1980 songs
EMI Records singles